The Coalburn Branch was a branch line constructed by the Caledonian Railway from Lesmahagow railway station to Bankend railway station. It was the main branch of the Lesmahagow Railway.

History

Coalburn Branch (1856-1968) 
1 December 1866, Motherwell, Ferniegair (Chatelherault), Larkhall (Larkhall East), Ayr Road (Dalserf), Stonehouse, Cots Castle, Bents (Netherburn), Blackwood,  Auchenheath and Brocketsbrae railway stations open.

 1 May 1868, Bents is renamed to Netherburn.
 1 June 1869, Brocketsbrae is renamed to Lesmahagow.
 1 October 1876, Tillietudlem opens.
 2 October 1876, Ferniegair and Motherwell are re-located.
 1 November 1891, Coalburn opens.
 January 1893, Alton Heights opens.
 1 July 1903, Ayr Road is renamed to Dalserf.
 1 June 1905, Lesmahagow is renamed Brocketsbrae.
 1 July 1905, Stonehouse, Cots Castle and Blackwood closes; Stonehouse opens.
 1 June 1906, Larkhall is renamed to Larkhall East.
 1 January 1917, Ferniegair and Motherwell closes.
 1926, Alton Heights closes.
 July 1926, Bankend closes.
 January 1941, Larkhall East, Dalserf, Netherburn, Tillietudlem, Auchenheath and Brocketsbrae close.
 May 1945, Dalserf, Netherburn, Tillietudlem, Auchenheath and Brocketsbrae re-open.
 July 1945, Larkhall East re-opens.
 10 September 1951, Larkhall East closes.
 1 October 1951, Dalserf, Netherburn, Tillietudlem, Auchenheath and Brocketsbrae closes.
 4 October 1965, Auchlochan, Coalburn and Stonehouse close.

Present day 
 1974, British Rail build a new Motherwell railway station.
 15 May 1989, Airbles railway station opens.
 December 2005, Chatelherault railway station reopens.

Gallery

See also 
 Lesmahagow Railway
 Caledonian Railway branches in South Lanarkshire#Topography
 Hamilton Branch (railway)

References

External links
Rails to Coalburn

Pre-grouping British railway companies
Caledonian Railway
Closed railway lines in Scotland
Early Scottish railway companies
Railway lines opened in 1856